Cell Chemical Biology is a monthly, peer-reviewed, scientific journal published by Cell Press. 
The journal publishes research in chemical biology and studies at the interface of chemistry and biology.

References

External links
 

Biochemistry journals
Cell Press academic journals
Monthly journals